Robert Aikin Wright (1885 – 7 December 1955) was an Irish rugby international. He won one cap against Scotland in 1912.

References
Robin Wright at Scrum.com
IRFU Profile

1958 deaths
Place of death missing
Irish rugby union players
Ireland international rugby union players
Monkstown Football Club players
1885 births
Rugby union players from County Dublin
Rugby union fullbacks
Sportspeople from Dún Laoghaire–Rathdown